Manuel Junction is a railway junction near the village of Whitecross, Falkirk, Scotland. It is the terminus of the Bo'ness and Kinneil Railway (operated by the Scottish Railway Preservation Society (SRPS)) and forms a connection between it and the Glasgow–Edinburgh via Falkirk line.

It is not to be confused with Bo'ness Junction which refers rather to the mainline junction adjacent to Manuel Junction on the Edinburgh–Glasgow line. There is no station here but services operated almost entirely by ScotRail pass on the Edinburgh–Glasgow service and Edinburgh–Dunblane service. The area's signals are controlled by Edinburgh Signalling Centre (SC). There is a loop on the westbound side and a disused west facing siding. The siding leading to the Bo'ness and Kinneil Railway and Manuel Junction is east facing on the eastbound side and is controlled by Bo'ness ground frame, which is released by Edinburgh SC.

History
The junction is constructed on the site of the original Edinburgh and Glasgow Railway Bo'ness Junction station which was first opened on 21 February 1842. The original station had two platforms on the E&G (upper) line. In 1856 a single platform was opened with the (lower) Slamannan and Borrowstounness Railway line, part of the Monkland Railways and connected to the Slamannan Railway. Trains going from Bo'ness to the E&GR (westbound) used a steeply graded curve which the modern trackbed shares which rose from the north-facing Bo'ness Low Junction up to the west-facing Bo'ness High Junction. To the west of the Bo'ness High Junction was the east-facing Coatbridge Line Junction which allowed trains from the Linlithgow direction to head southbound on the Monkland Railways.

The low-level station was closed in 1933. The upper station at Manuel survived until 1967 at which time the branch was cut back to  Colliery.

Preservation

The current junction with Network Rail is east-facing.

There is now a platform at Manuel and passengers on the branch service can now be able to alight and disembark whilst the train waits for the locomotive to run-round each and every trip. The newly constructed platform finally opened (officially to the public) on 29 June 2013.

The old station building at Moniaive has been offered to the SRPS as a suitable structure for the site.

Track layout
Manuel's track layout features a long curving loop with a short headshunt at the west end. The link-line leaves the loop approximately 13 BR Mk1 coach lengths from the end of the headshunt. A small trap point is located some way up the link line and further up, a gate, signifying the edge of the SRPS's ground. On the approach to Manuel, a fixed distant signal is encountered shortly before the line curves and climbs steeply up to the junction itself. The points at the north-west end of the loop are controlled by a 3-lever ground frame known as Manuel North. The east-facing link line is controlled by a 5-lever ground frame which includes mechanical control of two signals: a raised yellow disc signal reads up the link line and up onto Network Rail and a small arm signal prevents moves onto the B&KR. The points at the west end are hand points. Both ground frames are controlled by the train staff using Annett's locks and all signals are tubular upper quadrant in design. The points at the Network Rail end of the link-line are controlled from a ground frame released from Edinburgh SC.

References

Notes

Sources

External links 
 
 
 
Video footage of Manuel Junction

Rail junctions in Scotland
Railway stations in Great Britain opened in 1842
Railway stations in Great Britain opened in 1856
Railway stations in Great Britain closed in 1933
Railway stations in Great Britain closed in 1967
Heritage railway stations in Falkirk (council area)
Beeching closures in Scotland
Former North British Railway stations
Railway stations built for UK heritage railways
Railway stations in Great Britain opened in 2013
1842 establishments in Scotland
1856 establishments in Scotland
2013 establishments in Scotland
1933 disestablishments in Scotland
1967 disestablishments in Scotland